Helcionella is a genus of helcionellid, a fossil marine invertebrate animal that is considered to be a mollusk and may possibly be a gastropod. The shells of these animals are about a centimetre in size. The tip of the shell extends beyond the rear extremity of the shell's aperture, and the shell is "endogastric" in shape.

Helcionella is the type genus of the family Helcionellidae.

References

 A. W. Grabau and H. W. Shimer. 1909. North American index fossils, invertebrates 1-909

Helcionelloida
Cambrian animals of Europe
Paleozoic life of Alberta
Paleozoic life of British Columbia
Paleozoic life of Newfoundland and Labrador

Cambrian genus extinctions